Owen Nickie is a Sint Maarten professional football manager. In 2004, he coached the Saint Martin national football team.

References

Year of birth missing (living people)
Living people
Sint Maarten football managers
Dutch football managers
Expatriate football managers in the Collectivity of Saint Martin
Saint Martin national football team managers
Place of birth missing (living people)